Robert Nivison, 1st Baron Glendyne (3 July 1849 – 14 June 1930) was a Scottish stockbroker.

Nivison was the son of John Nivison, a colliery manager of Sanquhar in Dumfriesshire. At the age of fifteen he joined the local branch of the British Linen Bank as a junior clerk. In 1869 he joined the London and Westminster Bank, later moving to the head office in London. In 1881 he switched careers, becoming a junior partner of the stockbrokers T. P. Baptie, becoming a member of the London Stock Exchange in 1883. In 1886, he established his own firm, R. Nivison & Co. It became a very successful business, especially after 1891, when it began to act as stockbroker to the governments of the Dominions.

For his services to the British and Dominion governments Nivison was created a baronet in 1914 and raised to the peerage as Baron Glendyne, of Sanquhar in the County of Dumfries, in the 1922 New Year Honours.

Lord Glendyne married Jane, daughter of John Wightman, of Sanquhar, Dumfriesshire, in 1877. He died in June 1930, aged 80, and was succeeded in his titles by his son John.

Arms

Footnotes

References
Biography, Oxford Dictionary of National Biography
Kidd, Charles, Williamson, David (editors). Debrett's Peerage and Baronetage (1990 edition). New York: St Martin's Press, 1990.

1849 births
1930 deaths
Barons in the Peerage of the United Kingdom
People from Sanquhar
Scottish stockbrokers
Scottish bankers
Baronets in the Baronetage of the United Kingdom
Barons created by George V